The Heinkel HD 38 was a fighter aircraft developed in Germany in the late 1920s. It was a compact, single-bay biplane with staggered wings of unequal span, braced with N-type interplane struts, a refined version of the HD 37 that had been evaluated and rejected by the Reichswehr for use at the secret training facility at Lipetsk. The HD 38 was designed in the hope of capturing a different niche - that of a seaplane fighter, and was designed with a twin pontoon undercarriage that could be quickly removed and replaced with wheels. It was accepted in this role, but did not serve in it for long before being relegated to general training duties. Even then, it was not long before Germany abandoned the Lipetsk base to the Soviet Union.

Specifications (with wheels)

References

 

1920s German fighter aircraft
Floatplanes
HD 38
Biplanes
Single-engined tractor aircraft
Aircraft first flown in 1928